Mehmet Emin Yazgan (1876 in Constantinople (Istanbul) – February 21, 1961 in Istanbul) was an officer of the Ottoman Army and a general of the Turkish Army.

See also
List of high-ranking commanders of the Turkish War of Independence

Sources

1876 births
1961 deaths
Military personnel from Istanbul
Ottoman Military Academy alumni
Ottoman Army officers
Ottoman military personnel of the Greco-Turkish War (1897)
Ottoman military personnel of the Italo-Turkish War
Ottoman military personnel of the Balkan Wars
Ottoman military personnel of World War I
Turkish military personnel of the Turkish War of Independence
Turkish military personnel of the Greco-Turkish War (1919–1922)
Turkish Army generals
Recipients of the Liakat Medal
Recipients of the Medal of Independence with Red Ribbon (Turkey)